PMSE can refer to:
 Polar mesospheric summer echoes, the phenomenon of anomalous radar echoes found in the polar atmosphere.
 Programme making and special events, a term used to denote equipment that is used to support broadcasting and other events.